Magnus Felix Ennodius (473 or 47417 July 521 AD) was Bishop of Pavia in 514, and a Latin rhetorician and poet.

He was one of four Gallo-Roman aristocrats of the fifth to sixth-century whose letters survive in quantity: the others are Sidonius Apollinaris, prefect of Rome in 468 and bishop of Clermont (died 485), Ruricius bishop of Limoges (died 507) and Alcimus Ecdicius Avitus, bishop of Vienne (died 518). All of them were linked in the tightly bound aristocratic Gallo-Roman network that provided the bishops of Catholic Gaul. He is regarded as a saint, with a feast day of 17 July.

Life 
Ennodius was born at Arelate (Arles) and belonged to a distinguished but impecunious family. As Mommaerts and Kelley observe, "Ennodius claimed in his letters to them to be related to a large number of individuals. Unfortunately, he seldom specified the nature of the relationship." Because his sister Euprepia (born 465 or 470) is known to have had a son named Flavius Licerius Firminus Lupicinus, who was named for his grandfather, Vogel argued that Ennodius' father was named Firminus. Jacques Sirmond suggested that Ennodius was the son of one Camillus of Arles, whose father was a proconsular and the brother of Magnus, the consul of 460; but Mommaerts and Kelley dismiss Sirmond's identification as untenable.

Having lost his parents at an early age, Ennodius was brought up by an aunt at Ticinum (Pavia); according to some, at Mediolanum (Milan). After her death he was received into the family of a pious and wealthy young lady, to whom he was betrothed. It is not certain whether he actually married this lady; she seems to have lost her money and retired to a convent, whereupon Ennodius entered the Church, and was ordained deacon (about 493) by Epiphanius, bishop of Pavia.

From Pavia he went to Milan, which Ennodius made his home until his elevation to the see of Pavia about 515. During his stay at Milan he visited Rome and other places, where he gained a reputation as a teacher of rhetoric. As bishop of Pavia he played a considerable part in ecclesiastical affairs. On two occasions (in 515 and 517) he was sent to Constantinople on an embassy to the emperor Anastasius, to endeavour to bring about a reconciliation over the Acacian schism that divided the Eastern and Western churches. Ennodius' epitaph still exists in the basilica of San Michele Maggiore, Pavia.

Writings 
Ennodius is one of the best representatives of the two-fold (pagan and Christian) tendency of 5th century literature, and of the Gallo-Roman clergy who upheld the cause of civilization and classical literature against the inroads of barbarism. But his anxiety not to fall behind his classical models—the chief of whom was Virgil—his striving after elegance and grammatical correctness, and a desire to avoid the commonplace have produced a turgid and affected style, which, aggravated by rhetorical exaggerations and popular barbarisms, makes his works difficult to understand. It has been remarked that his poetry is less unintelligible than his prose.

The numerous writings of this ecclesiastic may be grouped into four types: letters, miscellanies, discourses, and poems. His letters on a variety of subjects, addressed to high church and state officials, are valuable for the religious and political history of the period. Of the miscellanies, the most important are:
The Panegyric of Theodoric, written to thank the Arian king for his tolerance of Catholicism and support of Pope Symmachus (probably delivered before the king on the occasion of his entry into Ravenna or Milan); like all similar works, it is full of flattery and exaggeration, but if used with caution is a valuable authority
The Life of St Epiphanius, bishop of Pavia, the best written and perhaps the most important of all his writings, an interesting picture of the political activity and influence of the church
Eucharisticon de Vita Sua, a sort of confessions, after the manner of Augustine of Hippo
the description of the enfranchisement of a slave with religious formalities in the presence of a bishop
Paraenesis didascalica, an educational guide, in which the claims of grammar as a preparation for the study of rhetoric, the mother of all the sciences, are strongly insisted on.
The discourses (Dictiones) are on sacred, scholastic, controversial and ethical subjects. The discourse on the anniversary of Laurentius, bishop of Milan, is the chief authority for the life of that prelate; the scholastic discourses, rhetorical exercises for the schools, contain eulogies of classical learning, distinguished professors and pupils; the controversial deal with imaginary charges, the subjects being chiefly borrowed from the Controversiae of Seneca the Elder; the ethical harangues are put into the mouth of mythological personages (e.g. the speech of Thetis over the body of Achilles).

Amongst the poems mention may be made of two Itineraria, descriptions of a journey from Milan to Brigantium (Briançon) and of a trip on the Po River; an apology for the study of profane literature; an epithalamium, in which Love is introduced as execrating Christianity; a dozen hymns, after the manner of Ambrose, probably intended for church use; epigrams on various subjects, some being epigrams proper—inscriptions for tombs, basilicas, baptisteries—others imitations of Martial, satiric pieces and descriptions of scenery.

Critical editions
The editio princeps of Ennodius was published by Johann Jakob Grynaeus in 1569 at Basel. Sirmond edited his works in 1611, organizing the individual works into the four groupings described above; this presentation remained "the classic text" until Guilelmus Hartel (vol. vi. of Corpus Scriptorum Ecclesiasticorum Latinorum, Vienna, 1882). However, it was not until 1885 that Friedrich Vogel prepared an edition for the Monumenta Germaniae Historica (Auctores Antiquissimi, vol. vii), that the individual works were once again presented in the miscellaneous order of the manuscripts. Vogel did so seeing traces of a chronological sequence in that order, which Sr. Genevieve Cook notes led to "a series of studies on the chronology of the works of Ennodius".

A modern edition of Ennodius' correspondence is under way: Stéphane Gioanni, Ennode de Pavie, Lettres, tome I: Livres I et II, Paris, Les Belles Lettres, 2006, based on his 2004 Ph.D. thesis. See a first review (Joop van Waarden) and Stéphane Gioanni, Ennode de Pavie, Lettres, tome II, livres III et IV, Paris, Les Belles Lettres, 2010.

Notes

Further reading 

Michael Fertig, Ennodius und seine Zeit (1855–1860)
Augustin Dubois, La Latinité d'Ennodius (1903)
 , Ennodio (Pavia, 1886)
Friedrich Adolf Ebert, Allgemeine Geschichte der Litt. des Mittelalters im Abendlande, i. (1889)
Max Manitius, Geschichte der christlich-lateinischen Poesie (1891)
Teuffel, History of Roman Literature, 479 (Eng. tr., 1892). French translation by the abbé S. L'église (Paris, 1906 fol.).
Cook, G.M. The Life of Saint Epiphanius by Ennodius. A Translation with an Introduction and Commentary. Washington, 1942.
Kennell, Stefanie A. H. Magnus Felix Ennodius: a gentleman of the church. Ann Arbor: University of Michigan Press, 2000.
Kennell, Stefanie A. H., "Latin Bishops and Greek Emperors: Ennodius' Missions to Constantinople," in Maria Gourdouba, Leena Pietilä-Castrén & Esko Tikkala (edd), The Eastern Mediterranean in the Late Antique and Early Byzantine Periods (Helsinki, 2004) (Papers and Monographs of the Finnish Institute at Athens, IX),
Stéphane Gioanni, "La contribution épistolaire d'Ennodius de Pavie à la primauté pontificale sous le règne des papes Symmaque et Hormisdas", in Mélanges de l'École française de Rome (MEFRM), 113. 1, 2001, p. 245–268.

470s births
521 deaths
Bishops of Pavia
Medieval Italian saints
5th-century Latin writers
Latin letter writers
People of the Ostrogothic Kingdom
5th-century Gallo-Roman people
6th-century Italian bishops
6th-century Christian saints
6th-century Latin writers
6th-century Italian writers